Gimhwa County was a historical county of Korea. In 1914, Geumseong (Kumsong) County was merged to Gimhwa. In 1953, most of original Gimhwa County became part of South Korea.  North Korea abolished Kimhwa County in 1952, but restored it in 1954. South Korea restored it in 1954, however Gimhwa County of South Korea was merged to Cheolwon County in 1962. After a reform in 2001, most of the original (pre-1914) Gimhwa County in North Korea was annexed to Pyonggang County.

Counties of Korea